311 (commonly known as the Blue Album) is the third studio album by American rock band 311, released on July 11, 1995 by Capricorn Records. The album contains the successful singles "Don't Stay Home", "All Mixed Up", and "Down", and was certified triple platinum with sales of over three million copies.

Reception

AllMusic's Peter Stepek was positive towards the album, saying "These riff-heavy and radio-ready songs are underscored by a tight drum sound (often with a piccolo snare), the scratching of turntables, and the crunch of heavy guitars: a formidable backdrop for this surprisingly melodic effort. The rhythms of reggae and ska percolate through this mix, and the harmonies of Nick Hexum and S.A. Martinez lend the band an edge not found in the majority of bands that feature rapping over rock beats." Rolling Stone says the album has "ear candy with good beats" and "remarkably adept at genre juggling". They also describe the album as "Beasties-cum-Chili Peppers traits has a potent reggae undertow".

Track listing

"Misdirected Hostility" was written in reference to the violence between the Phunk Junkeez and their back-up vocalist K-Tel Disco.

The initial pressing of the album was distributed by "RED" and later re-pressed and distributed by Mercury Records in 1996 (note the tray card and disk updated with Mercury contact information and slightly washed out color on the disk front).

Outtakes
 "Tribute", "Let the Cards Fall", "Gap" and "Firewater (Slo-mo)" (available on the "Enlarged to Show Detail" EP)
 "Who's Got the Herb?" (studio version available on the "Hempilation: Freedom Is NORML" compilation, live version available on the "Live" album)
 "Outside" (available on the "National Lampoon's Senior Trip" soundtrack)
 "Juan Bond", "Next (Instrumental)", "Sweet (Demo)" without SA's vocal and "Firewater" at its normal speed (leaked on the internet around '96). "Juan Bond", "Next", and "Firewater (Normal Speed)" were later officially released in 2015 on the 311 ARCHIVE box set.

Personnel
 Nick Hexum – vocals, rhythm guitar
 Chad Sexton – drums, percussion
 Tim Mahoney – lead guitar 
 P-Nut – bass
 S. A. Martinez – vocals, scratches (Credited as Count S.A.)

Production
Ron Saint Germain – producer, recording, mixing
311 – producers
Scott Ralston – recording, mixing
John Ewing Jr. – assistant engineer
Joe Gastwirt – mastering
 Mastered at Oceanview Studios
 Diane Painter – art direction
Terry Robertson – design
Catherine Wessel – photography

Charts

Weekly charts

Year-end charts

Singles

Certifications

References

External links
 http://www.311.com

311 (band) albums
1995 albums
Capricorn Records albums
Albums produced by Ron Saint Germain